Panthera fossilis (also known as Panthera leo fossilis or Panthera spelaea fossilis), is an extinct species of cat belonging to the genus Panthera, known from remains found in Eurasia spanning the Middle Pleistocene and possibly into the Early Pleistocene. P. fossilis has sometimes been referred to by the common names steppe lion or cave lion, though these names are conventionally restricted to the later related species P. spelaea, to which P. fossilis is probably ancestral.

Discoveries 
It was first described from remains excavated near Mauer in Germany. Bone fragments of P. fossilis were also excavated near Pakefield in the United Kingdom, which are estimated at 680,000 years old. Bone fragments excavated near Isernia in Italy are estimated at between 600,000 and 620,000 years old. The first Asian record of a fossilis lion was found in the Kuznetsk Basin in western Siberia and dates to the late Early Pleistocene.

Evolution 
P. fossilis is estimated to have evolved in Eurasia about 600,000 years ago from a large pantherine cat that originated in the Tanzanian Olduvai Gorge about 1.2–1.7 million years ago. This cat entered Eurasia about 780,000–700,000 years ago and gave rise to several lion-like forms. The first fossils that can be definitively classified as P. fossilis date to 610,000 years ago. Recent nuclear genomic evidence suggest that interbreeding between modern lions and all Eurasian fossil lions took place up until 500,000 years ago, but by 470,000 years ago, no subsequent interbreeding between the two lineages occurred.

Characteristics 
Bone fragments of P. fossilis indicate that it was larger than the modern lion and was among the largest cats. Skeletal remains of P. fossilis populations in Siberia measure larger than those in Central Europe. Compared to a modern lion,  P. fossilis had a slightly wider skull and nasal cavity, smaller orbits, less inflated bullae, less specialized lower teeth, reduced lower premolars and smaller incisors.

Taxonomic history 
P. fossilis was historically considered an early lion (P. leo) subspecies as Panthera leo fossilis. Some authors considered it a subspecies of Panthera spelaea (Panthera spelaea fossilis) or treat it as a distinct species. Some employ a subgenus of Panthera, "Leo", to contain several lion-like members of Panthera, including P. leo, P. spelaea, P. atrox and P. fossilis. A 2022 study concluded that P. fossilis and P. spelaea represented a chronospecies lineage, with most differences between the two species explainable by size differences.

Results of mitochondrial genome sequences derived from two Beringian specimens of Panthera spelaea indicate that it and Panthera fossilis were distinct enough from the modern lion to be considered separate species.

Palaeobiology 
This lion coexisted with early humans and prehistoric fauna. A mandible from the early hominid Homo heidelbergensis was excavated in 1907 at Mauer, Germany.

Herbivores that coexisted with the lion included the hippopotamus, narrow-nosed rhinoceros, straight-tusked elephant, southern mammoth, moose, steppe bison and fallow deer. Sympatric predators included bears, wolves, hyenas and saber-toothed cats.

See also 
 History of lions in Europe
 Panthera leo sinhaleyus
 Panthera pardus spelaea

References 

Leo
Pleistocene mammals of Europe
Pleistocene carnivorans
Pleistocene species extinctions
Fossil taxa described in 1906